KGFW (1340 AM) is an American radio station broadcasting a News Talk Information format.  Licensed to Kearney, Nebraska, United States, the station serves the Grand Island-Kearney area.  The station is owned by NRG Media and features programming from Fox News Radio, Compass Media Networks, Premiere Networks and Westwood One.  KGFW is a sister station to KQKY and KRNY.

History
The station was founded in Ravenna, Nebraska, in June 1927 by Roy McConnell, a former radio technician in the United States Navy. The station moved to Kearney in 1931. In 1939, the station was purchased by Lloyd "Skipper" Thomas, a Nebraska native who had managed major radio stations including Pittsburgh's KDKA and Boston's WBZ.

After Thomas' death in 1952, the station was purchased by John Mitchell, a lawyer who had worked as a part-time announcer at the station.

Mitchell's stations were purchased by Waitt Radio in 2000. Waitt Radio merged with NewRadio Group in 2005 to form NRG Media.

Notable alumni
 Floyd Kalber, broadcaster for NBC
 Charlie Tuna, prominent Los Angeles-based DJ

References

External links

Early history of KGFW

GFW
NRG Media radio stations